André Oostrom (born 17 October 1953) is a Dutch former professional footballer who played as a midfielder. Active in both the Netherlands and North America, Oostrom made nearly 300 career league appearances.

Career
Born in Utrecht, Oostrom began his professional career with his hometown club of FC Utrecht in 1974. Oostrom moved to VVV-Venlo in 1977, before moving to the North American Soccer League in 1980, to play with the Edmonton Drillers. In 1983, he played with the Toronto Nationals of the Canadian Professional Soccer League. In 1983, Oostrom returned to the Netherlands, playing with the Go Ahead Eagles until 1986.

References

External links
NASL career stats
 Profile at Voetbal International

1953 births
Living people
Dutch footballers
Edmonton Drillers (1979–1982) players
North American Soccer League (1968–1984) indoor players
North American Soccer League (1968–1984) players
Eredivisie players
FC Utrecht players
Go Ahead Eagles players
VVV-Venlo players
Footballers from Utrecht (city)
Expatriate soccer players in Canada
Dutch expatriate sportspeople in Canada
Association football midfielders
Toronto Nationals (soccer) players
Canadian Professional Soccer League (original) players